Selina Chilton (born 1981) is an English actress. After making appearances in various stage productions including The Taming of the Shrew, Can-Can and Marianne Dreams, she was cast in the BBC soap opera Doctors. She appeared in the soap as Ruth Pearce from 2008 to 2011.

Life and career
Chilton was born in Leicester and trained in acting and dance at a young age. In 2006, she began her stage career with appearances in theatre productions such as The Taming of the Shrew, A Midsummer's Night Dream and The Boy Friend. In 2007, she was cast in the lead role of a production of Marianne Dreams at the Almeida Theatre. A year later, she was cast in the BBC soap opera Doctors. She appeared as series regular Ruth Pearce from 2008 to 2011. For her portrayal of the role, she received two nominations at the 2009 British Soap Awards, for both Best Actress and Best Newcomer. She then won the Acting Performance award at the 2009 RTS Midlands Awards, as well as garnering another Best Actress nomination at the 2010 British Soap Awards, a Best Daytime Star nomination at the 2010 Inside Soap Awards and a Most Popular Newcomer nomination at the 15th National Television Awards.

Stage

Filmography

Awards and nominations

References

External links
 

1981 births
Living people
Actresses from Leicestershire
English soap opera actresses
English television actresses
English musical theatre actresses
English stage actresses
People from Leicester